A VHS tape rewinder is an electronic device used to rewind VHS tapes.

History
Much like Beta tape rewinders, VHS tape rewinders devices were created shortly after the production of videotapes and were used because VCRs were believed to make kinks in the tapes which could corrupt playback after several rewinds. Video rental stores like Blockbuster charged a fee for not rewinding VHS tapes when returning, and had slogans like 'Be kind, please rewind'. The rewinder would rewind tapes smoothly and additionally be several times faster. Using them would also prevent wear and tear on the heads of the VHS itself, and provide convenience to watch the next tape immediately after.

In 1993 a video magazine editor surveyed electronics repair experts, asking them, "What is the worst thing you can do to your VCR?" The most common answer was regular rewinding rented videotapes. The experts advised using a tape rewinder to save VCR heads from "junk" on rental cassettes.

References

External links

VHS